The women's 100 metre backstroke event at the 1948 Olympic Games took place between 3 and 5 August, at the Empire Pool. This swimming event used the backstroke. Because an Olympic-size swimming pool is 50 metres long, this race consisted of two lengths of the pool.

Medalists

Results

Heats

Semifinals

Final

Key: OR = Olympic record

References

Women's backstroke 100 metre
1948 in women's swimming
Women's events at the 1948 Summer Olympics